Magyargencs is a village in Veszprém county, Hungary.

Notable residents
 Jacob Katz (1904-1998), Israeli historian and educator.
 father of Don Shula, came from Magyargencs to Ohio

External links 
 Street map (Hungarian)

Populated places in Veszprém County